Alicja Konieczek (born 2 November 1994) is a Polish Olympic runner specializing in the 3000 metres steeplechase. In 2020 she joined On Athletics Club sponsored by Swiss company On. She won the gold medal at the 2019 Summer Universiade and the Super League European Team Championships in Chorzow. Tokyo 2020 was her first Olympics, where she ran second fastest time of her career (9:31.79) and took 20th place. in 2019, she ran 9:44.96 at the IAAF World Championships in Qatar placing 28th.

Her younger sister Aneta graduated from University of Oregon in 2022. She has multiply medals from the Polish Championships and a few Polish records in different age categories. Their older brother Dawid was also a runner that graduated from Western Colorado University in 2017 who has won several medals at the age National Championships and represented Poland internationally.

In 2020, Alicja Konieczek served as volunteer coach with University of New Mexico cross country & track and field teams and now coaches distance runners through final surge.

In January of 2022, Alicja has left the prestigious training group, On Athletics Club, in Boulder, Colorado that is coached by Dathan Ritzenhein. Alicja found a career in 2022 in Albuquerque as an event director with Jackrabbit Race Management.

EDUCATION
In 2014, Alicja started at the Western Colorado University where she graduated in 2019 with an summa cum laude honors in Exercise Sport Science.

International competitions

Personal bests
Outdoor
800 metres – 2:15.16 (Biała Podlaska 2014)
1500 metres – 4:18.80 (Wałcz 2021)
3000 metres – 10:10.51 (Słubice 2014)
5000 metres – 15:53.56 (Phoenix 2021)
3000 metres steeplechase – 9:25.15 (Munich 2022)

Indoor
800 metres – 2:11.70 (Albuquerque 2020)
mile – 4:37.42 (Birmingham, AL 2017)
3000 metres – 8:51.08 (Boston, MA, 2023)

References

External links
 
 

1994 births
Living people
Polish female steeplechase runners
People from Zbąszyń
Universiade gold medalists in athletics (track and field)
Universiade gold medalists for Poland
Medalists at the 2019 Summer Universiade
Athletes (track and field) at the 2020 Summer Olympics
Olympic athletes of Poland